= Tetima =

- Village
- Location within Bosnia and Herzegovina
- Coordinates: 44.5880303°N 18.7400149°E
- Country: Bosnia and Herzegovina
- Entity: Federation of Bosnia and Herzegovina
- Canton: Tuzla
- Municipality: Tuzla

Area
  - Total: 2.73 sq mi (7.06 km^{2})

Population (2013)
  - Total: 147
  - Density: 53.9/sq mi (20.8/km^{2})
- Time zone: UTC+1 (CET)
  - Summer (DST): UTC+2 (CEST)

Tetima is a village in the municipality of Tuzla, Tuzla Canton, Bosnia and Herzegovina.

== Demographics ==
According to the 2013 census, its population was 147.

Ethnicity in 2013
Ethnicity	Number	Percentage
Croats	130	88.4%
Bosniaks	8	5.4%
Serbs	1	0.7%
other/undeclared	8	5.4%
Total	147	100%
